Welsh gold is gold that occurs naturally in two distinct areas of Wales and highly prized because of its origin and scarcity. One area it is found in is north Wales in a band stretching from Barmouth, past Dolgellau and up towards Snowdonia. This was mined at several mines, the largest of which were the Gwynfynydd Gold Mine, near Ganllwyd, and the Clogau Gold Mine near Bontddu. In south Wales, it is found in a small area in the valley of the River Cothi at Dolaucothi where it is known to have been mined by the Romans.

Celtic jewellery such as torcs were worn by early Welsh princes, and ancient gold artefacts found in Wales include the Mold Cape and the Banc Ty'nddôl sun-disc, found at the Cwmystwyth Mines in 2002.  It is not possible to confirm that these use Welsh gold since there were strong trade links between Wales and Ireland at the time and Ireland was the major area of gold working in the Bronze Age British Isles. Irish gold is especially well known from the Irish Bronze Age as jewellery, in the form of gold lunulae, torcs, gorgets, rings, and bracelets. It was presumably collected by panning from alluvial placers in river beds or near old rivers.

Dolaucothi

The earliest known Welsh gold mine was the Dolaucothi Gold Mines near Pumsaint in Carmarthenshire, which was initiated by the Romans in or about 74 AD, and closed in 1938 and was donated to the National Trust in 1941. A hoard of gold objects was found near the village of Pumsaint close to the mines in the 18th century and is now in the British Museum.

However, Dolaucothi is best known for its exploitation on a large scale during the Roman period, from about 75 AD on to 300 AD at least. Hydraulic mining methods preceded opencast and then deep mining at the site. The many opencast workings were produced by hushing and fire-setting during the Roman period in Roman Wales. The workings were initially under military control with a small Roman fort under the present village of Pumsaint and the workings have yielded large amounts of late Roman pottery (77 AD to 300 AD plus) from the reservoir known as "Melin-y-milwyr" or soldiers mill.

The Dolaucothi mine is open to the public under the aegis of the National Trust and visitors can explore the many surface features at the site, as well as be escorted on a tour of the extensive underground workings.

North Wales

Gwynfynydd
The Gwynfynydd Gold Mine in Dolgellau closed in January 1999. In January 2007, the BBC and other news organisations reported that the final traces of "economically extractable" gold had been removed from the mines and surrounding soil. Even the local road surface had been filtered for traces, marking the end of the current mining operation. Gwynfynydd  was discovered in 1860. It was active until 1998 and has produced 45,000+ troy ounces of Welsh gold since 1884. The Queen was presented with a kilogram ingot of Welsh gold on her 60th birthday (April 1986) from this mine. In the 1990s the mine was open to the public and provided guided tours which included the opportunity to pan for gold. The mine closed because Health and Safety issues and because of changing pollution control legislation which would have made the owners liable for the quality of the mine discharge into the River Mawddach had the mine remained open.

In 2016, the Welsh gold jewellery firm Clogau, bought Gwynfynydd, seventeen years after ceasing production.

Clogau
Another gold mine lies nearby, the Clogau mine. The Clogau Gold Mine (sometimes known as the Clogau St David's Mine) was once the largest and richest mine of all the gold mines in the Dolgellau gold mining area. It is situated in Bontddu, near Barmouth in Gwynedd in north-west Wales.

After producing copper and a little lead for quite a number of years, the mine developed into gold production in the 1862 'rush' and continued as a major operator until 1911, during which 165,031 tons of gold ore was mined resulting in 78,507 troy ounces (2,442 kg) of gold.

It worked the St David's lode of Clogau mountain alongside the co-owned Vigra Mine. Since 1911 the mine has been re-opened several times for smaller-scale operations. It last closed in 1998.

In 1989, William Roberts, founder of Welsh jewellery brand Clogau, acquired the rights to mine and conducted a few years of small scale mining at the Clogau St David's mine in Dolgellau before its eventual closure in 1998 – due to the high costs of extraction and the diminishing quantities of rare Welsh gold being found.

Occurrence
Welsh gold forms in veins or lodes of ore that yield up to 30 troy ounces per long ton (920 g/Mg). In comparison, South African gold ore yields just a quarter of a troy ounce for every tonne mined (8 g/Mg). However the South African gold fields are vastly more extensive.

Patronage

The link between Welsh gold and the British royal family began on 13 July 1911 when Prince Edward was officially invested as Prince of Wales in a ceremony at Caernarfon Castle on the edge of Snowdonia, North Wales. The regalia used at the investiture consisted of a coronet, a rod, a ring, a sword and a mantle with doublet and sash which incorporated Welsh gold. The investiture took place at the initiative of the Welsh politician David Lloyd George, who invented a ceremony in the style of a Welsh pageant, and coached Edward to speak a few words in Welsh. On 1 July 1969, Prince Charles was invested at Caernarfon Castle. The ceremony was an update of the 1911 investiture, and the same regalia was used.

Welsh gold has been used to create wedding rings for some members of the Royal family. Elizabeth Bowes-Lyon, used a Welsh gold ring in her marriage to the Duke of York on 26 April 1923. Queen Elizabeth II's wedding ring was crafted from Welsh gold from the Clogau St. David's mine. Other members of The Royal family to have Welsh gold wedding rings include Princess Anne (1973), Diana, Princess of Wales (1981), King Charles III (1981 & 2005), Catherine, Princess of Wales (2011), Meghan, Duchess of Sussex (2018) and Princess Eugenie (2018).

See also
Irish gold
Scottish gold

References

External links 
 
 Wales Underground:  Gold
 Wales calling: Gold Mining in Wales
 The Geology of the Dolgellau Gold-Belt
 I. M. Platten and S. C. Dominy (2009) "Geological mapping in the evaluation of structurally controlled gold veins: A case study from the Dogellau gold belt, north Wales, United Kingdom", World Gold Conference 2009, South African Institute of Mining and Metallurgy, PDF file, accessed 14 November 2010.

Mining in Wales
Gold mining
Gold
History of Wales
Geology of Wales
Gold mining in the United Kingdom